Wajih Nahlé (in Arabic ), (February 1, 1932 – February 21, 2017), born in Beirut, Lebanon, was a Lebanese postwar and contemporary master painter, calligrapher and sculpture who has created new and original forms of expression, a pioneer in his generation. He studied painting in the workshop of the Lebanese painter Moustafa Farroukh. Nahlé's work shows an interest for the decorative aspect of calligraphy.

Career 
Wajih Nahle showed his work in more than sixty exhibitions, in Europe as in the arab world, and has received an honorary doctorate from the Lebanese American University in Beirut, and is member of the French Association of international artists.

fundador de la "Unión de Artistas Árabes", miembro de la Asociación Internacional de Artistas de Francia

Exhibitions 

 Rétrospective 1952/1977 : "lettres rebelles" première exposition à Paris 6-28 octobre, Wally Findlay Galleries, 1977.
Foire internationale d'art contemporain au Beirut Hall, 1999
Galerie l´Olivier, 2001
Institut des cultures arabes et méditerranéennes at the OMPI / WIPO 2017

Bibliography

References

External links
 Lynn Teo Simarski, Keepers of Lebanon's Light, 1989, Saudi Aramco World
 Exhibitions

Lebanese painters
1932 births
Artists from Beirut
Calligraphers of Arabic script
2017 deaths